James William Kunetka (born September 29, 1944) is an American writer best known for his science fiction novels Warday and Nature's End.  He has also written non-fiction on the topic of the atomic age.

Early life and education
Kunetka was born and grew up in Albuquerque, New Mexico. He received a BA in Political Science from the University of Texas at Austin.

Career
Kunetka's first book, City of Fire, was published in 1978.  He co-wrote two novels with his long time friend Whitley Strieber, including his best known book, Warday.  A film about this book was planned, but never filmed.

In 2000, Kunetka was the director of communications and constituent relations at the University of Texas at Austin.  He also served as an associate vice president of the university before retirement.

Bibliography
City of fire: Los Alamos and the birth of the Atomic Age, 1943-1945 (1978)
Oppenheimer: The Years of Risk (1982)
Warday (1984), with Whitley Strieber
Nature's End (1986), with Whitley Strieber
Shadow Man (1988)
Parting Shot (1991)
The General and the Genius: Groves and Oppenheimer (2015) (Regnery Publishing)

References

External links
James Kunetka at WorldCat

Kunetka, James at SFE: Science Fiction Encyclopedia

American science fiction writers
Living people
1944 births